Live Rails is an album by musician Steve Hackett. It was recorded during the tour around the release of Out of the Tunnel's Mouth. It is also the first of Hackett's official live releases since The Tokyo Tapes to feature a significant number of Genesis songs. Their inclusion foreshadows the Genesis Revisited tours that would occur several years later. A related release to this one is the Fire and Ice DVD, also recorded around the same time, which includes more emphasis on Genesis-era tracks.

Track listing
Disc 1
"Intro"  2:18
"Every Day"  6:51
"Fire on the Moon"  6:17
"Emerald and Ash"  9:00
"Ghost in the Glass"  3:23
"Ace of Wands"  6:48
"Pollution C"  2:21
"The Steppes"  6:01
"Slogans"  4:22
"Serpentine"  6:43
"Tubehead"  6:06

Disc 2
"Spectral Mornings"  5:58
"Firth of Fifth"  10:39
"Blood on the Rooftops"  6:31
"Fly on a Windshield"  2:07
"Broadway Melody of 1974"  1:47
"Sleepers"  7:32
"Still Waters"  5:31
"Los Endos"  7:44
"Clocks"  8:05

Musicians
 Steve Hackett : Guitar, vocals
 Amanda Lehmann : Vocals, guitar 
 Nick Beggs : Bass, Chapman Stick, Vocals, Taurus Pedals
 Roger King : Keyboards
 Rob Townsend : Whistle, Flute, Percussion, Saxophone, Keyboards, Vocals
 Gary O'Toole  : Drums

References

2011 live albums
Steve Hackett albums
Inside Out Music live albums